Jodi Tod-Elliott (born 4 February 1981) is a New Zealand netball player in the ANZ Championship, playing for Waikato Bay of Plenty Magic and Northern Mystics.

References
ANZ Championship profile

1981 births
Living people
New Zealand netball players
Waikato Bay of Plenty Magic players
Northern Mystics players
ANZ Championship players